Sept. 5th (stylized as SEPT. 5TH) is the debut studio album by Canadian R&B duo Dvsn, released on March 27, 2016, by OVO Sound and Warner Bros. Records. The album's production was handled primarily by Nineteen85, assisted by Noël Cadastre and Stephen Kozmeniuk.

The album received positive reviews and was listed in some best-of-the-year year-end lists, including that by Spin magazine.

Singles
On September 5, 2015, the two singles "The Line" and "With Me" were released. Both tracks' production were handled and provided by Nineteen85.

On December 2, 2015, the album's third single, "Too Deep", was released. The production on this track was handled and provided also by Nineteen85.

On December 24, 2015, the album's fourth single, "Hallucinations", the production of which was handled and provided by Nineteen85 and Stephen Kozmeniuk, was released.

Critical reception

Upon release, SEPT. 5TH received positive reviews from music critics.

Spin magazine placed the album at #34 in its best albums of the year year-end list.

Track listing

Notes
  signifies a co-producer.
 "Too Deep" features additional vocals by Amoy Levy, Camille Harrison and Shantel May Marquardt.
 "In + Out" features additional vocals by August Rigo and Victoria Sheahan.
 "Sept. 5th" features additional vocals by Shantel May Marquardt.
 "Another One" features background vocals by Shantel May Marquardt and Rahiem Hurlock.
 "Angela" features additional vocals by James Vincent McMorrow, and a sample of Angeles by Elliott Smith.

Personnel
Credits for Sept. 5th adapted from AllMusic.

 Harley Arsenault – mixing engineer
 Chris Athens – mastering
 Les Bateman – mixing engineer
 Noël Cadastre – mixing, producer, recording
 Noel "Gadget" Campbell – mixing
 Leonardo Delapena – guitar
 Dvsn – primary artist, vocals
 Camille Harrison – additional vocals
 Dave Huffman – engineer
 Rahiem Hurlock – background vocals
 Paul Jefferies – mixing
 Stephen Kozmeniuk – producer
 Amoy Levy – additional vocals
 Shantel May Marquardt – additional vocals, background vocals
 James Vincent McMorrow – additional vocals
 Greg Moffett – mixing engineer
 Nineteen85 – producer
 August Rigo – additional vocals
 Travis Sewchan – recording
 Victoria Sheahan – additional vocals
 Noah Shebib – mixing

Charts

Release history

References

External links
 

2016 debut albums
Dvsn albums
Albums produced by Nineteen85
OVO Sound albums
Warner Records albums